Thuidiopsis is a genus of mosses belonging to the family Thuidiaceae.

The species of this genus are found in Australia and Southern America.

Species
As accepted by GBIF:

References

Hypnales
Moss genera